The 1935 Navy Midshipmen football team represented the United States Naval Academy during the 1935 college football season. In their second season under head coach Tom Hamilton, the Midshipmen compiled a  record and outscored their opponents by a combined score of 136 to 89.

Schedule

References

Navy
Navy Midshipmen football seasons
Navy Midshipmen football